Sir John Ailbe O'Hara KC is a Judge of the High Court of Justice in Northern Ireland.

A native of Belfast and a graduate of St Mary's Christian Brothers Grammar School, Mr Justice O'Hara was sworn into office before the Rt Hon Sir Declan Morgan, Lord Chief Justice of Northern Ireland, on 8 April 2013. He was called to the Bar of Northern Ireland in 1979 and was named Queen's Counsel in 1999.

Cases
 THE BELFAST HEALTH AND SOCIAL CARE TRUST (12 October 2012)
 Acquittal of Ivor Bell (28 October 2019)

References

Barristers from Northern Ireland
Year of birth missing (living people)
Living people